Cora guzmaniana is a species of basidiolichen in the family Hygrophoraceae. Found in Mexico, it was formally described as a new species in 2019 by Bibiana Moncada, Rosa Emilia Pérez-Pérez, and Robert Lücking. The lichen is only known from the type locality, where it grows as an epiphyte in patches of Juniperus trees. The specific epithet honours Mexican mycologist Gastón Guzmán, "for his paramount contributions to mycology in Mexico and Latin America as a whole".

References

guzmaniana
Lichen species
Lichens described in 2019
Lichens of Mexico
Taxa named by Robert Lücking
Basidiolichens